Iwadate (written: 岩舘) is a Japanese surname. Notable people with the surname include:

, Japanese baseball player
, Japanese manga artist
, Japanese footballer

See also
Iwadate Station, a railway station in Akita, Japan

Japanese-language surnames